Emu Plains is a suburb of Sydney in the state of New South Wales, Australia. It is 58 kilometres west of the Sydney central business district, in the local government area of the City of Penrith and is part of the Greater Western Sydney region.

Emu Plains is on the western side of the Nepean River, located at the foot of the Blue Mountains.

History

Aboriginal culture
Prior to European settlement, what is now Emu Plains was on the border of the Western Sydney-based Darug people and the Southern Highlands-based Gandangara people, whose land extended into the Blue Mountains. The local Darug people were known as the Mulgoa who lived a hunter-gatherer lifestyle governed by traditional laws, which had their origins in the Dreamtime. They lived in huts made of bark called 'gunyahs', hunted kangaroos and emus for meat, and gathered yams, berries and other native plants.

European settlement
The first British explorers to visit the area surveyed Emu Plains in August 1790 led by Watkin Tench, and named it Emu Island after emus they sighted on the land and in the mistaken belief that the land was actually on an island in the Nepean River. It was first referred to by its current name by Governor Lachlan Macquarie on 15 April 1814, when he toured the island also realising that it was not an island but a plain that occasionally flooded giving the appearance of an island. When William Cox started building his road over the Blue Mountains from there, The Cox's Road started work at Emu Plains on 18 July 1814. A government farm with convict labour was established in 1813 with 1,326 convicts working on growing local agriculture. It closed in 1833 and the land was Gazetted and sold to establish the village of Emu Plains.

Emu Ferry Post Office opened on 1 April 1863 and was renamed Emu Plains in 1882.

The removal of river-stones from the Nepean River for concrete and road-base was begun by the Emu and Prospect Gravel and Road Metal Company in the 1880s. A railway siding, which was to be ultimately expanded into a short branch, was first laid in from the Main Western Line at Emu Plains in 1884. Railway operations, which included their own locomotives, continued until 1967, after when only a siding, shunted by Government trains, remained. All railway operations ceased in 1993.

Emu Plains has a number of landmark buildings:
 The railway station is a notable building of brick and sandstone, with Tudor chimneys, built in 1883. It is unusual for railway stations because it has two storeys; it has a Local Government Heritage Listing.
 Emu Hall is a substantial home by the Nepean River. It was built in 1851 by Toby Ryan (1818–1899), who occupied the house until 1875. The house has a Local Government Heritage Listing.
 St Paul's Anglican Church was built in 1848 and has a cemetery.
 The former Arms of Australia Inn was built in 1833 to service the roads through the area. It has been restored by the Nepean District Historical Society with government funding and is used as a historical museum. It has a Local Government Heritage Listing.
 At the corner of Russell Street and the Great Western Highway is the original Emu Plains post office, a sandstone Gothic cottage.

Commercial area
The main commercial centre is Lennox Village (formerly Centro Lennox), named after David Lennox.The shopping centre features Aldi and Woolworths.

There is a concrete plant located in town in the industrial area, this plant is owned and operated by Holcim Australia, the plant was formerly owned by PF Concrete and currently services the western suburbs region including Penrith six days a week.

Transport
Emu Plains railway station is situated on the T1 (North Shore & Western Line) of the Sydney Trains network. It is the last station on the suburban line with Lapstone, the next station to the west, considered part of the Intercity network. While a long distance from Sydney city, there are many express services from Emu Plains to the city. Emu Plains is also serviced by  Blue Mountains Transit.

Emu Plains can easily be accessed from Penrith via the Great Western Highway. Access from further east is best obtained by the M4 Western Motorway. If travelling east from the Blue Mountains, access is best obtained by the Great Western Highway.

Education
The local government primary school is Emu Plains Public School and the high school is Nepean Creative and Performing Arts High School. There is also a Catholic primary school, Our Lady of the Way, and high school, Penola Catholic College.

Cultural attractions
Penrith Regional Gallery & The Lewers Bequest is an art gallery established at the former property of artists Gerald and Margo Lewers. It is at 86 River Road Emu Plains. The property was bought by the Lewers in the 1940s and in 1950 it became their permanent home and studio. Gerald died in 1962 and Margo continued to live and work there until her death in 1978. In 1980 the Lewers' daughters donated the site, buildings, gardens and a substantial collection of art to Penrith City Council. The Gallery was opened in August 1981 by the New South Wales Premier, Neville Wran. Every year tens of thousands of visitors inspect the gallery's exhibitions and use the gardens and café.

Heritage listings 
Emu Plains has a number of heritage-listed sites, including:
 Main Western railway: Emu Plains railway station
 Arms of Australia Inn (1826)
 St Paul's Anglican Church (1848)
 Police Cottage (1908)

Churches

Anglican
The Parish of St Paul's Emu Plains was formed and the Church School licensed on 8 November 1848. The first resident rector was appointed in 1856 and the church building consecrated on 16 August 1872. The chancel was added to the original building about 1887. The original rectory and most of the church records were lost on 4 January 1929 in a bushfire.

At the time of the centenary of the church in 1948, the parish was responsible also for branch churches Christ Church Castlereagh and St Thomas' Cranebrook, and later also included St David's Llandilo. In more recent times these branch churches have become linked with the parish of Cambridge Park, and Emu Plains has become a single-church parish.

Apart from the original church building, the property currently consists of the Parish Centre (with hall, offices, resource centre, kitchen) built in 1991, two timber two-room Classrooms, a staff residence built in 1969 and a second worker's home located in Beach Street.

They have a traditional Anglican service at 8am followed at 9.30am with a contemporary service for all ages that is particularly popular with younger families. Then at night they have a 6:30 Church is a casual and contemporary meeting popular with young and old, students and workers, singles and families.

Catholic
Our Lady of the Way is a part of the Catholic Diocese of Parramatta in Western Sydney. Rev Robert Anderson served between 2004 and 2014. As of 2015 and onwards, Rev Mick O'Callaghan is the current priest however has not been confirmed due to the absence of a Bishop in the diocese. They have mass at 8am & 9.30am every Sunday. church website

Baptist
 Emu Plains Community Baptist Church has been ministering to the people of Emu Plains and the surrounding suburbs since August 2001.  The first minister was Rev. John Giles, who came out of retirement to serve the new and growing church in a part-time capacity.

By 2004, the church had grown to the extent that they were able to call its first full-time Pastor.  Rev. Steve Turnbull commenced his ministry with Emu Plains Community Baptist Church in February of that year and concluded at the end of October 2010.

The services were initially held in the Emu Plains Community Centre, which served the congregation well until the growing numbers meant that the space was no longer sufficient.  On 23 October 2005, the services were moved just down the road to Melrose Hall which meets at 9.35am on Sundays

Population

Demographics 
At the 2016 census, there were 8,421 residents in Emu Plains. Aboriginal and Torres Strait Islander people made up 3.6% of the population. 79.8% of residents were born in Australia. The next most common countries of birth were England 5.1%, New Zealand 1.4%, Scotland 0.7%, Netherlands 0.6% and Philippines 0.5%. The top responses for religious affiliation were Catholic 29.1%, Anglican 23.4% and No Religion 21.0%. The top ancestries were Australian 29.1%, English 28.8%, Irish 10.2%, Scottish 6.9% and German 2.4%. 87.3% of people spoke only English at home. Other languages spoken at home included Greek 0.9%, Arabic 0.5%, Croatian 0.4%, Macedonian 0.3% and Italian 0.3%.

Notable residents
 Edwin Evans (1849–1921), Australian cricketer
 William Carter (1902–1952), Australian silent film actor, lived at Westbank House, a substantial estate and orchard now subdivided and facing Nepean Street
 Sir Francis Forbes (1784–1841), chief justice of New South Wales, who built the house Edinglassie at Emu Plains
 Gerald Lewers (1905–1962) and Margo Lewers (1908–1978), artists who donated their house as the Penrith Regional Art Gallery
 Toby Ryan (1818–1899), early landholder, sportsman and politician

Governance
Until 1963, Emu Plains was part of Blue Mountains City Council but was then transferred to Penrith City Council, where it is currently split between the North and South Wards. At the state level, it is part of the Electoral district of Penrith, represented by Liberal Stuart Ayres. Federally, it is part of the Division of Lindsay, represented by Liberal Melissa McIntosh.

See also
 Emu Plains Correctional Centre
 Emu Plains JRLFC

References

 Emu Plains and Thereabouts, Joan Steege, 1980

External links

 Penrith Local Suburb Profiles
 Emu Plains Public School

 
Towns in New South Wales